William McCaughey (December 12, 1929 – May 26, 2000) was an American sound engineer. He won an Oscar for Best Sound and was nominated for four more in the same category.

Selected filmography
McCaughey won an Academy Award and was nominated for four more:

Won
 The Deer Hunter (1978)

Nominated
 The Wind and the Lion (1975)
 King Kong (1976)
 Rocky (1976)
 Meteor (1979)

References

External links

1929 births
2000 deaths
American audio engineers
Best Sound Mixing Academy Award winners
Artists from Kansas City, Missouri
Emmy Award winners
20th-century American engineers